Kapatid is the Tagalog word for "sibling".

Kapatid may refer to:
Kapatid (band), a Filipino rock band formed in 2003
Kapatid Channel, a Philippine-based television station available outside the Philippines
TV5 or The Kapatid Network, a television network in the Philippines